Guzmán de Alfarache is a picaresque novel written by Mateo Alemán and published in two parts: the first in Madrid in 1599 with the title , and the second in 1604, titled .

The works tells the first person adventures of a picaro, a young street urchin, as he matures into adulthood. It thus ultimately both recounts adventures and moralizes on those childish excesses. Guzmán de Alfarache, by this means, is conceived as an extensive doctrinal sermon about the sins of society, and was so received by the author's contemporaries, despite the hybrid qualities between an engaging novel and a moralizing discourse.

The novel was highly popular in its time. Many editions were published, not only in Spanish, but in French, German, English, Italian, and Latin. The English translation, by James Mabbe, was published in 1622, under alternative titles The Rogue and The Life of Guzman de Alfarache.

Apocryphal sequels and imitations were also soon produced, being that of 1602, written, probably, by the lawyer and poet Juan Martí, under the pseudonym of Mateo Luján de Sayavedra, and published in Valencia, the most important and successful, due to its influence on the second part of Alemán.

Genre 

This novel has many similarities to other picaresque novels such as Lazarillo de Tormes. The main character is an antihero, born in infamy, and emerging into a lower-class world of delinquency and roguish misadventures. He ends up condemned as a prisoner to be a galley-slave, seeking absolution for his past life.

Modern editions 
Among the most prominent modern editions are those by:

Francisco Rico, Barcelona, Planeta, 1987. 
José María Micó, Madrid, Cátedra, 1987.

Adaptations
In 1987, a loose film adaptation titled The Rogues was  directed by Mario Monicelli.

Notes 
This is an abridged entry based on the Spanish Wikipedia entry.

External links

Digital versions 

Primera parte de Guzmán de Alfarache, edición en pdf a partir de la  de Rosa Navarro Durán, Novela picaresca, Tomo I, Madrid, Fundación José Antonio de Castro (Biblioteca Castro), 2004, págs. 55-346. Link to PDF of the First part. (226 Kb).
Segunda Parte de Guzmán de Alfarache, ed. en pdf a partir de la ed. cit. supra, págs. 347-717. Link to PDF of the Second part. (193 Kb).
Vida y hechos del pícaro Guzmán de Alfarache: atalaya de la vida humana, Amberes, Jerónimo Verdussen, 1681. Joint edition of both parts with engravings by Gaspar Bouttats. Digital reproduction by the Biblioteca Virtual de Andalucía. .

Spanish literature
1599 novels
1604 novels
Picaresque novels
Spanish satirical novels